Muret is a railway station in Muret, Occitanie, France. The station is on the Toulouse–Bayonne railway. The station is served by TER (local) services operated by the SNCF.

Train services
The following services currently call at Muret:
local service (TER Occitanie) Toulouse–Saint-Gaudens–Tarbes–Pau

References

Railway stations in Haute-Garonne
Railway stations in France opened in 1862